World Without End is a science fiction novel by American writer Joe Haldeman, a tie-in of Star Trek TV series. It was published by Bantam Books in February 1979.

Plot 
Captain Kirk and a landing party of four have gone aboard an alien starship/planetoid. They are in prison, awaiting questioning.

Commander Spock is in command, but is unable to do much. Mysterious tentacles have ensnared the ship, draining power. Spock finds himself with few options, remaining on board and eventually crashing to the planetoid surface or beaming inside to join the Captain.

References

External links 

 

1979 American novels
1979 science fiction novels
American science fiction novels
Bantam Books books
Novels based on Star Trek: The Original Series